Mirror of My Mind is an album by Japanese guitarist Ryo Kawasaki that was released in 1979. It was recorded at Power Station Studios in New York City.

Track listing
 Trinkets & Things (Kawasaki/Shottam) (Ryka/BMI) 6:48
 I've Found the Way of Love (Kawasaki) (Ryka/BMI) 6:58
 Dreams for Radha Part I,II & III (Kawasaki) (Ryka/BMI) 7:49
 Brasiliana (Baden Powell) Gema 4:06
 Winter's Here (Kawasaki/Shottam) (Ryka/BMI) 4:05
 In & Out of Love (Kawasaki) (Ryka/BMI) 6:41
 Little One (Kawasaki) (Ryka/BMI) 4:51

Personnel
 Ryo Kawasaki – electric guitar, acoustic guitar
 Leon Pendarvis – electric piano, arrangement
 Anthony Jackson – bass guitar
 Harvey Mason – drums
 Rubens Bassini – percussion
 Michael Brecker – tenor saxophone
 Radha Shottom (Radha Thomas) – vocals

References

External links
Jazz Review

1979 albums